Falu Kuriren (‘The Falu Courier’) is a Swedish local newspaper published in Falun, Dalarna, Sweden by Dalarnas Tidningar, a subsidiary of the Bonnier Group.

History and profile
Falu Kuriren was established by Waldemar Skarstedt in 1894. The paper has its headquarters in Falun and its political stance is independent liberal. It is published in tabloid format. In 2008, it was acquired by Mittmedia, and is fully owned by the company.

Falu Kuriren sold 29,400 copies in 1996.

References

External links
 

1894 establishments in Sweden
Mass media in Falun
Liberalism in Sweden
Publications established in 1894
Swedish-language newspapers
Bonnier Group